Wateranga is a rural locality in the North Burnett Region, Queensland, Australia.

Geography
The Burnett River forms the western and northern boundaries.

References 

North Burnett Region
Localities in Queensland